DJ Flare (born Sean Moran) is an American turntablist. He has been a scratch DJ since 1983 with many vinyl releases and was a member of the turntablist group the Invisibl Skratch Piklz, appearing in many of their Turntable TV videos and DJ Qbert's animated film Wave Twisters.  He released battle records under the pseudonym "DJ Butchwax" on the Thud Rumble and Dirtstyle Records labels.  He also created the Flare Skratch, a scratching technique in which a sound is split in two parts leaving limitless sound possibilities to be created. He released a Skratch DVD called Magnifrying Glass. He is also credited for creating the modern day style of Skratch Flare Skratching. Notable mentions, Flare was also a member of Sound Odyssey, The Bulletproof Skratch Hamsters and N.C.A "no clickers allowed" DJ crew and has worked with such music artists as RUN D.M.C, Third Eye Blind, El' Stew, Buckethead,       Moonraker, MCM & The Monster  and singer Mike Patton from Faith No More amongst others.

DJ Flare was featured in the 2001 documentary film Scratch, and also in Wave Twisters.

Discography
 DJ Flare and D-Styles - Pharaohs of Funk-CD-(2000-Slit Wrist Recordings)
 DJ Flare - Magnifrying Glass-Dj tool-DVD-(2005-DropZone Studio Recordings)
 DJ Flare and Extrakd - Electrocutioner-12" single-(2001-Stray Records) 
All of these releases are Battle records.
 Butt Crack Breaks
 Butt Ugly Breaks
 Barnyard Breaks
 Hee Haw Breaks
 Hee Haw Breaks 2
 Heavy Petting Breaks
 Headshrinker Breaks
 HillBilly Breaks
 Horny Martian Breaks
 Stoney Breaks
 Shampoo Breaks
 Shiggar Fraggar (2000)
 Seek and Destroy Breaks Vol.5

Further reading

References

External links
 Cargo Records - List of releases and a photo on Cargo Records, a UK vinyl store

American hip hop DJs